Vizefeldwebel Friedrich Manschott (21 February 1893 – 16 March 1917) was a German World War I flying ace credited with 12 aerial victories.

Early life

Friedrich Manschott was born on 21 February 1893 in Reichartshausen, Großherzogtum Baden, the German Empire.

Aerial service

Manschott earned his flyer's badge on 10 August 1916. His first assignment was to a reconnaissance unit, FA 203. There he downed his first foe, a Farman, on 15 December 1916. He was then transferred to a fighter unit, Jagdstaffel 7. Between 5 January and 16 March 1917, he shot down eleven more enemy. Immediately after he shot down his third observation balloon, on 16 March, he lost a combat to four Caudrons and was killed in action.

Victory list
Confirmed victories are numbered; unconfirmed claims are labeled 'U/C'.

Sources of information

References
 Above the Lines: The Aces and Fighter Units of the German Air Service, Naval Air Service and Flanders Marine Corps 1914 - 1918. Norman L. R. Franks, et al. Grub Street, 1993. , .

1893 births
1917 deaths
Recipients of the Iron Cross (1914), 1st class
People from Rhein-Neckar-Kreis
People from the Grand Duchy of Baden
Prussian Army personnel
Military personnel of the Grand Duchy of Baden
Luftstreitkräfte personnel
German military personnel killed in World War I
Aviators killed by being shot down
German World War I flying aces
Military personnel from Baden-Württemberg